The 2016 United States Senate election in Vermont was held November 8, 2016, to elect a member of the United States Senate to represent the state of Vermont, concurrently with the 2016 U.S. presidential election, as well as other elections to the United States Senate in other states and elections to the United States House of Representatives and various state and local elections. The primaries were held August 9.

Incumbent Democratic Senator Patrick Leahy, the most senior member in the Senate, the longest-serving U.S. Senator from Vermont, and the first Democrat to be elected to a Senate seat in Vermont, won re-election to a record eighth term in office. This is the most recent Senate election in the state where the Republican nominee carried any counties.

Democratic primary

Candidates

Declared 
 Cris Ericson, perennial candidate, later ran as Marijuana Party nominee (also ran for Governor)
 Patrick Leahy, incumbent U.S. Senator

Results

Republican primary

Candidates

Declared 
 Scott Milne, businessman, candidate for the State House in 2006 and nominee for Governor in 2014

Liberty Union primary 
This election was the last in which Diamondstone ran prior to his death in 2017. Diamondstone had run for Vermont statewide office in every biennial election since 1970.

Candidates

Declared 
 Peter Diamondstone, LU party co-founder, lawyer, and perennial candidate

Other candidacies

Declared 
 Jerry Trudell, independent candidate, environmental activist, candidate for House of Representatives in 2014
 Cris Ericson, Marijuana Party perennial candidate, previously sought Democratic nomination

General election

Candidates 
 Patrick Leahy (D)
 Scott Milne (R)
 Jerry Trudell (I)
 Peter Diamondstone (LU)
 Cris Ericson (MJ)

Predictions

Debates

Polling

Results

References

External links

Official campaign websites (Archived) 
 Patrick Leahy (D) for Senate
 (MJ) for Senate
 Scott Milne (R) for Senate
 Jerry Trudell (I) for Senate

Debates 
 Complete video of October 18, 2016 debate

Senate
Vermont
2016